Phillips Field was a medium-sized stadium (maximum capacity approximately 20,000) located on the west bank of the Hillsborough River across from downtown Tampa, immediately adjacent to the University of Tampa. It opened on October 4, 1937, and served as the home for the University of Tampa's football team from 1937 to 1967. The facility was named for local businessman I. W. Phillips, who donated the land to the school so that the Spartans would not have to share nearby Plant Field, which was often unavailable due to its use for many different sports and community events. 

Besides "Tampa U" home games, Phillips Field hosted many other sporting events. It was the home football field for Middleton High School and Blake High School, two segregated schools that ended the season with a rivalry game at the field. Hillsborough High School and Plant High School also played their annual rivalry at the site. Phillips Field was the site of the Cigar Bowl, the area's first college bowl game, from 1946 to 1954,  and the Florida Gators scheduled several home games at the facility during the 1930s and 1940s. Phillips Field was also the site of several NFL preseason contests in the mid-1960s that helped Tampa earn an eventual expansion franchise.

The field was also the site of stock car races, large boxing matches, and other community and sporting events.

When Tampa Stadium was completed in 1967, the city of Tampa gave Plant Field to the University of Tampa, and Phillips Field fell into disuse. It was razed in the early 1970s, and Tampa Preparatory School and Julian Lane Riverfront Park were built at its former location.

References

College football venues
Tampa Spartans football
1950s in Florida
1940s in Florida
History of Tampa, Florida
Demolished sports venues in Florida
1937 establishments in Florida
Sports venues completed in 1937
Defunct American football venues in the United States
American football venues in Florida